Stadio Comunale Matusa was a multi-use stadium in Frosinone, Italy. It was used mostly for football matches and was the home ground of Frosinone Calcio — replaced by Stadio Benito Stirpe. The stadium holds 10,000.

References

External links
Stadium's page at Frosinone Calcio's official homepage
Stadium journey article

Matusa
Matusa
Frosinone
Frosinone Calcio
Sports venues in Lazio
Sports venues completed in 1932
1932 establishments in Italy